Marc Murphy (born c.1969 in Milan, Italy) is an executive chef, restaurateur and television food personality.

Early career

Murphy graduated from Fryeburg Academy in 1988 and attended school at the Institute of Culinary Education. He began his culinary career as a line cook at Prix Fixe in New York. By the mid-1990s, he was a sous-chef at Layla in New York and in 1996, became the executive chef at Cellar in the Sky, also in New York. From 1997 to 2000, he was the co-owner and executive chef of La Fourchette. In 2000, he also became the executive chef at Chinoiserie as well as the partner and co-owner of Le Couteau.

Restaurants
In March 2004, Murphy opened his first solo enterprise, Landmarc, in Tribeca. Over the next fifteen years, his restaurants expanded to include: Ditch Plains in the West Village (2006), Landmarc in the Time Warner Center (2007-2019), Kingside at the Viceroy Hotel (2003) and Grey Salt at the Seminole Hard Rock Hotel and Casino Tampa in 2015. In 2019 it was announced he'd
partner with Levent Veziroglu for Grisini Food Hall and Coffee Shops at New Jersey's American Dream.

Media 
Murphy has served in a regular role as a judge on Chopped, and has made appearances on Iron Chef America, Guy's Grocery Games, Beat Bobby Flay, Unique Eats, The Best Thing I Ever Ate, The Best Thing I Ever Made, Rachael Ray and Today, among others. He is the president of the Manhattan chapter of the New York State Restaurant Association. In 2012, Murphy joined the United States Department of State's Diplomatic Culinary Partnership, where he takes part in public diplomacy programs that engage foreign audiences abroad as well as those visiting the United States. Murphy's debut cookbook, Season with Authority: Confident Home Cooking was released in April 2015.

He launched a podcast, Food 360 with Marc Murphy on June 6, 2019 in collaboration with HowStuffWorks.

Personal life

The son of a "globetrotting" diplomat, Murphy has lived all over the world as a boy, in cities such as Milan, Paris, Rome, Genoa, and Washington, D.C. before the age of 12, which he says served as an excellent education in French and Italian cooking. He opened his restaurant with his wife, Pamela Schein, and resides with her and their two children, in New York City.

In a question and answer interview with The New York Times, Murphy has also attributed his cooking influences to his mother and grandparents, as he has recounted experiences of enjoying leg of lamb and ratatouille in the south of France. He has also credited French chef Jean-Louis Palladin's first cookbook for having the biggest impact on him, as well as the "strength" and "leadership" of Winston Churchill's My Early Life.

See also

Chopped (TV series)

References

External links

Murphy's website

American television chefs
Food Network chefs
American male chefs
Living people
American restaurateurs
Fryeburg Academy alumni
1960s births
People from Milan